The Missionaries of Christ Jesus are a Catholic religious institute founded in Javier, Spain in 1944. Members use the post-nominal letters MCJ.

History 
The congregation was founded in Javier, Spain on 14 March 1944 by María Camino Sanz Orrio and was canonically formalized by Marcelino Olaechea Loizaga, bishop of Pamplona, in a decree on 5 June 1946.
Orrio was President of Catholic Action during the Spanish Civil War.

Orrio sought total renunciation and sacrifice for herself, and imagined that the new order would be a difficult way of life in mission to serve to the poorest, the abandoned, and the sick.

The sisters follow the Ignatian spirituality.
The congregation sought to be a more agile and effective style of missionaries. They sought to be women of faith and prayer, anchored in the essentials: the love of Jesus Christ and the consecration to the Mission. In order preserve this consecration, members of the order take a fourth vow to "march and serve the missions". However, this vow was suppressed in 1969. Everything they do as an order is expected to be in service to this ideal. The order sought to have minimal structures, schedules, and standards in order to maximize availability for service and prompt response to the most urgent needs.

The first sisters were the founder Maria Camino Sanz Orrio, Maria Concepción Arraiza Jáuregui and Maria Teresa Unzu Lapeira. Eugenia Nagore Nuin joined them just a few months later.
On 30 March 1944, the institute was constituted in Pia Unión, with the name of Missionaries of Christ Jesus. On 5 June 1946, it became a religious Congregation of Diocesan Law. On 3 October 1946, the first four Missionaries of Christ Jesus pronounced their vows.
The first members had initially planned to go to Japan, but instead the first group departed to India on 18 November 1948. This group consisted of Maria Camino Sanz Orrio, Guadalupe Velasco, Pilar Gonzalez, Maria del Villar and Margarita. Five sisters went to two mission posts at Kohima and Tura. At that time there were already 50 missionaries. In November 1951, two other sisters began a mission in Japan. In 1954 the first two Japanese members of the order began their formation.

On 27 June 1954 the Congregation for the Propagation of the Faith elevated the Missionaries of Christ Jesus to the status of an Institute of Pontifical Law.
In 1956, missions began in the Congo and Venezuela. In 1969 they began in Bolivia and soon after in Chile. Years later they go to the Philippines, the Dominican Republic, Cameroon, Chad and China. Currently there are 312 missionaries from Spain, Japan, India, Belgium, Slovenia, Congo, Bolivia, Chile, Venezuela, Guatemala, the Philippines and Vietnam.

The congregation received the Papal Decree of Praise on 27 June 1954 and final approval on 9 April 1962.

, they are present in Spain, Asia (China, Philippines, Japan, India), in the Americas (Bolivia, Chile, Dominican Republic, Venezuela) and in Africa (Congo, Cameroon, Chad); the general office is in Madrid.

The order runs the San Pedro Parish School in Los Chaguaramos, Venezuela and continues to maintain a presence in Javier, Spain.

In 1974, the order had 260 members. In 2008, they had 304 members in 54 houses. In 2013, they had 302 members.

The liturgical feast day of the congregation is on 3 December.

Notes

Citations

References

Further reading 
 https://religionennavarra.wordpress.com/2015/02/14/presentada-la-biografia-de-camino-sanz-orrio-fundadora-de-las-misioneras-de-cristo-jesus/
 http://misionerasdecristojesus.org/nosotros

External links 

1944 establishments in Spain
Religious organizations established in the 1940s
Catholic female orders and societies
Catholic missionary orders
Catholic religious institutes established in the 20th century